The 2014 Chicago Red Stars season is the sixth season of the soccer club and its second season in National Women's Soccer League.

First-team squad
Players that competed in 2014 NWSL season for Chicago Red Stars.

Squad correct as of August 31, 2014

Player movement

Note: Game day roster (GDR) are from regular season only

Management and staff 
Front Office
Coaching Staff
Manager Rory Dames
First Assistant and Goalkeeper Coach Trae Manny
Second Assistant Coach Christian Lavers

Regular-season standings

Results summary

Match results

Preseason

National Women's Soccer League

Results by round

Squad statistics
Source: NWSL

Key to positions: FW – Forward, MF – Midfielder, DF – Defender, GK – Goalkeeper

Awards

NWSL awards
NWSL Player of the Week

No player of Chicago Red Stars was named Player of the Week in 2014 season.

NWSL Best XI

No player of Chicago Red Stars was named to NWSL Best XI for 2014 season. However, two players, Christen Press and Julie Johnston were named to 2014 NWSL Second XI.

NWSL Rookie of the Year
Julie Johnston was named 2014 NWSL Rookie of the Year, out voting Kealia Ohai and Crystal Dunn.

Chicago Red Stars team awards
Chicago Red Stars announced on September 2 the 2014 team awards from the staff, media and fans. Notably, Julie Johnston was the Defender of the Year, as well as the Rookie of the Year. In a separate announcement, Christen Press was awarded Golden Boot as the team's top goal scorer despite playing only 12 games; this followed her previous year's performance in the Swedish Damallsvenskan where she was the league's top-scorer with 23 goals, and was awarded the league's Golden Boot.

Team Most Valuable Player
Lori Chalupny

Defender of the Year
Julie Johnston

Rookie of the Year
Julie Johnston

Community Service Award
Karina LeBlanc

Unsung Hero
Abby Erceg

Golden Boot
Christen Press

Notes

References 

2014
Chicago Red Stars
Chicago Red Stars
Depaul Illinois